My Son the Jihadi is a 2015 British documentary directed by Peter Beard. Produced for broadcast television. It was broadcast on 22 October 2015 on Channel 4.

Synopsis 
The documentary is about a British mother, Sally Evans, whose son, Thomas, had been recruited by—and joined—an Islamist terrorist organisation, Al-Shabaab, in Somalia.

Awards

References

External links 
 Official website
 

British documentary films
British television films
British television documentaries
2015 television films
2015 films
Channel 4 documentaries
2010s English-language films
2010s British films